Daniel Alan Alderman (born 14 August 1976) is an English first-class cricketer.  Alderman is a right-handed batsman who bowls right-arm medium pace.  He was born at Cuckfield, Sussex.

Alderman represented the Sussex Cricket Board in List A cricket.  His debut List A game came against Hertfordshire in the 1999 NatWest Trophy.  From 1999 to 2001, he represented the Board in 6 List A matches, the last of which came against Essex Cricket Board in the 1st round of the 2002 Cheltenham & Gloucester Trophy which was held in 2001.  In his 6 List A matches, he scored 38 runs at a batting average of 12.66, with a high score of 14*.  With the ball he took 3 wickets at a bowling average of 56.00, with best figures of 1/15.

He currently plays club cricket for Three Bridges Cricket Club in the Sussex Cricket League.

References

External links
Danny Alderman at Cricinfo
Danny Alderman at CricketArchive

1976 births
Living people
People from Cuckfield
English cricketers
Sussex Cricket Board cricketers